Robert John Renison (8 September 1875 – 6 October 1957) was an Irish-born Anglican bishop who worked in Canada.

Renison was born in Cashel, County Tipperary into an ecclesiastical family on 8 September 1875 and educated at Trinity College School and the University of Toronto. Ordained in  1896, his first position was as a curate at the Church of the Messiah, Toronto, after which he was a  missionary at Fort Albany. He was the Archdeacon of Moosonee and, after World War I service, the Archdeacon of Hamilton. He was then rector of Christ Church, Vancouver until 1929 when he became Dean of New Westminster. In 1931 he was elected Bishop of Athabasca but only held the post for a year. From then until 1943 he was rector of  St Paul's Toronto when he became the Bishop of Moosonee. In 1952 he became the Metropolitan of Ontario, a position he held until retirement in 1954. He died on 6 October 1957. Renison University College in Waterloo, Ontario is named after him.

Arms

References

1866 births
People from County Tipperary
Trinity College (Canada) alumni
University of Toronto alumni
Anglican archdeacons in North America
Deans of New Westminster
Anglican bishops of Moosonee
Anglican bishops of Athabasca
20th-century Anglican Church of Canada bishops
Metropolitans of Ontario
20th-century Anglican archbishops
1957 deaths